Josef Riedl (12 March 1884 – 16 November 1965) was an Austrian sculptor. His work was part of the sculpture event in the art competition at the 1936 Summer Olympics.

References

1884 births
1965 deaths
20th-century Austrian sculptors
Austrian male sculptors
Olympic competitors in art competitions
Artists from Vienna
20th-century Austrian male artists